The Huaneng Geermu Solar Park is a 50 MWp photovoltaic power station located in the Qinghai Province, in China. Most of it uses fixed tilt arrays, but has a 0.25 MW and a 5 MW single axis tracking section. Phase I is 5 MW, Phase II of the first section is 15 MW. 2 MW are amorphous silicon GS-50 modules from GS Solar rated 50 Watts each. The remaining 18 MW is polycrystalline silicon TW230(28)B modules from Tianwei New Energy PV Module rated 230 Watts each. A second section, called the Huaneng Geermu Phase II Solar Power Generation Project, 30 MWp, includes a 5 MW tracking section. The remaining 25 MW is fixed tilt. 15 MW uses TW235P60-FA2 modules from Tianwei New Energy PV Module, 10 MW uses YL235PT-29b modules from Yingli, and 5 MW uses TSM-235PC05 modules from Trina Solar. All of the modules are rated 235 Watts.

See also

List of photovoltaic power stations
Photovoltaic power station
Photovoltaics

References

Photovoltaic power stations in China
Buildings and structures in Qinghai